In computer science and visualization, a canvas is a container that holds various drawing elements (lines, shapes, text, frames containing others elements, etc.). It takes its name from the canvas used in visual arts.  It is sometimes called a scene graph because it arranges the logical representation of a user interface or graphical scene. Some implementations also define the spatial representation and allow the user to interact with the elements via a graphical user interface.

Library support
Various free and open-source canvas or scene-graph libraries allow developers to construct a user interface and/or user-interface elements for their computer programs.

Examples of free and open-source scene-graph canvas options include:
 in C, Evas (in EFL) from the Enlightenment project
 in C, Clutter, associated with the GNOME project
 in C, GTK Scene Graph Kit (GSK)
 in C++ or optionally in Qt's own markup language QML: Qt Quick, provides a scenegraph associated with the Qt project
 in C++, OpenSceneGraph, a 3D graphics API using OpenGL
 in C++, the OGRE engine, based on a scene graph, supports multiple scene managers
 in C++, OpenSG, a scene-graph system for real-time graphics, with clustering support and multi-thread safety
 in C++, the FlightGear Flight Simulator uses a custom Canvas system (LGPL'ed via SimGear) that is hardware-accelerated using OpenSceneGraph/OpenGL, OpenVG/ShivaVG: The FlightGear Canvas system
 in Java, the Java FX scene graph with 2D and 3D functionality
 in Tcl and other languages such as Perl, Python (Tkinter), and Ruby, the Tk toolkit provides a canvas widget for 2D graphics
 in Tcl and other languages such as Perl and Python, TkZinc  is an extended replacement for the Tk canvas, which adds support for hierarchical grouping, clipping, affine transformations, anti-aliasing, and specific items for air traffic control.

Some canvas modules within various libraries do not provide the power of a full scene-graph - they operate at a lower level which requires programmers to provide code such as mapping mouse-clicks to objects in the canvas. Examples of libraries which include such a canvas module include:
 in C++, KDE Plasma Workspaces Corona canvas
 the Canvas element in HTML5
 for Java, the AWT library Canvas
 for Java, the Java FX library Canvas
 for Java, the Swing library Canvas
 for Java, the SWT library Canvas, associated with Eclipse
 for Java-like JavaScript, the GWT library Canvas
 in C++, the papyrus Canvas library which renders using the Cairo (graphics) library
 in C, crcanvas, a GTK canvas widget which renders using the Cairo (graphics) library
 in C, GooCanvas, a GTK canvas widget which renders using the Cairo (graphics) library

Proprietary canvas libraries include, for example:
 the Microsoft Windows Win32 Canvas

References

Graphical user interface elements